A snow cone is a variation of shaved ice or ground-up ice desserts commonly served in paper cones or foam cups.  The dessert consists of ice shavings that are topped with flavored sugar syrup.

Depending on the region of North America, the terms "snowball", “ice cone” and "snow cone" may refer to different things. Where the distinction is made, the former refers to a dessert made of finely shaved ice ("like soft fresh snow"), while the latter contains ground-up ice that is coarser and more granular ("crunchy").

History

Industrial Revolution
In the 1850s, the American Industrial Revolution made ice commercially available in the United States. Ice houses in New York would commonly sell ice to states like Florida. To transport the ice to Florida, the ice houses would send a wagon with a huge block of ice south. The route to Florida would pass right through Baltimore where children would run up to the wagon and ask for a small scraping of ice. Before long, mothers started to make flavoring in anticipation of their children receiving some ice. The first flavor the women made is still a Baltimore favorite: egg custard. Egg custard was an easy flavor to make as the only ingredients were eggs, vanilla, and sugar.

Theaters
By the 1870s, the snow cone's popularity had risen to the degree that in the warm summer months, theaters would sell snow cones to keep their patrons cool. Because of this association with the theater, snow cones were thought of as an upper-class commodity. Signs in theaters instructing patrons to finish their snow cones before coming in to the second act are the earliest tangible evidence of snow cones. In the theaters in Baltimore during the time hand shavers were used to shave the ice. Around the city, snow cones were served on newspaper, but in the classy theaters, butchers' boats were used. In the 1890s, many people started to invent easier ways to make snow cones. In that decade, patents for electric ice shavers were filed.

Great Depression and World War II 
During the Great Depression and World War II, snowballs became available outside of Baltimore. As snowballs were so cheap, they were one of the few treats that people could afford. This inexpensiveness earned snowballs the nicknames Hard Times Sundae and Penny Sunday. People in need of a job could sell snowballs, as it required little overhead. The treat became more popular during World War II, when all available ice cream was sent to soldiers, creating a need for an icy treat. This newfound lack of competition helped snowballs become popular across the country.

See also

 Shaved ice § Regions, for similar shaved ice variations around the world.
 Italian ice - water ice
 Maple taffy - a Quebec and New England treat of boiled maple sap poured on snow
 Slush / Slushie - a shaved ice drink
Icee - brand-name product 
Slurpee - brand name 
Slush Puppie - brand name 
 Snow cream - a cream or snow and dairy-based dessert
 Piragua

References

Brands that became generic
Ice-based desserts
Cuisine of Baltimore